James Dale may refer to:
 James Dale (activist) (born 1970), respondent in Boy Scouts of America et al. v. Dale
 Boy Scouts of America v. Dale, a Supreme Court case involving a New Jersey scoutmaster
 Jim Dale (born 1935), English actor
 James Dale (cricketer) (1789–1828), English cricketer
 James Badge Dale (born 1978), American actor
 James Charles Dale (1792–1872), English naturalist
 James Dale (MP), English politician
 James Dale (footballer) (born 1993), English footballer
 James Dale (scientist), Australian agricultural scientist